This is a list of foreign players in the Canadian Soccer League (formally Canadian Professional Soccer League), which commenced play in 1998. The following players must meet the following criteria:
Are considered foreign, i.e., outside Canada determined by the following:
A player is considered foreign if he is not eligible to play for the national team of Canada.
More specifically,
If a player has been capped on international level, the national team is used; if he has been capped by more than one country, the highest level (or the most recent) team is used. These include Canadian players with dual citizenship.
If a player has not been capped on international level, his country of birth is used, except those who were born abroad from Canadian parents, or moved to Canada at a young age, and those who clearly indicated to have switched his nationality to another nation.

In bold: players who have played in the CSL in the current season (2022 Canadian Soccer League), and are still at the clubs for which they have played.

Africa (CAF)

Angola
 Edgar Bartolomeu  – North York Astros, Brampton Hitmen – 1998, 2001
 Filipe Bento – Vaughan Shooters – 2004
 Luis Cazengue – Toronto Supra – 2002
 Adam Shaban – Kingston FC, Milton SC – 2014, 2014–15

Burkina Faso
 Urbain Some – Ottawa Wizards – 2002–03
 Sa Brahima Traore – Ottawa Wizards, Oakville Blue Devils – 2002–03, 2005–06

Cameroon
 Stephane Assengue – Kingston FC – 2014–15
 Huffman Eja-Tabe – Oakville Blue Devils – 2006
 William Etchu Tabi  – London City SC, Burlington SC – 2012, 2013

Central African Republic 

 Moussa Limane – Scarborough SC – 2020–

Gambia
 Amadou Sanyang – TFC Academy – 2009

Ghana
 Fuseini Dauda – Hamilton Thunder – 2005

Liberia
 Preston Corporal – Hamilton Croatia, Brantford Galaxy, Niagara United – 2010, 2012, 2013
 Patrick Gerhardt – Brantford Galaxy – 2010
 Worteh Sampson – Windsor Border Stars – 2006

Malawi
 Peter Mponda – Ottawa Wizards – 2002–03
 McDonald Yobe – Ottawa Wizards – 2003

Morocco
 Hicham Aâboubou – Laval Dynamites, Trois-Rivières Attak – 2006, 2007
 Rachid Madkour – Laval Dynamites, Trois-Rivières Attak – (2005, 2006), 2007

Namibia
 Maleagi Ngarizemo – North York Astros – 2012

Nigeria
 Prince Ihekwoaba – Serbian White Eagles – 2008

Sierra Leone
 John Trye – Scarborough SC, Serbian White Eagles – 2017–2020, 2021–

South Africa
 Ryan Gamble – Toronto Supra, Oakville Blue Devils – 2001–02, 2005

Asia (AFC)

China
 Gong Lei – Toronto Olympians – 1998

Chinese Taipei 
 Emilio Estevez Tsai  – SC Waterloo Region – 2018

Hong Kong
 Michael Luk – Portugal FC – 2009

Syria  

 Molham Babouli – FC Ukraine United – 2019

Europe (UEFA)

Albania
 Isa Bulku – London City SC – 2003 
 Gentian Buzali – Toronto Croatia, London City SC – 2000, 2001–03, 2010 
Arlind Ferhati – Real Mississauga SC – 2019
 Blerim Rrustemi – Toronto Supra – 2000–01
 Ervin Ryta – Toronto Croatia, London City SC – 2000, 2003 
Eris Tafaj – London City SC – 2003–05, 2006, 2011

Belarus
 Valentin Radevich  – Montreal Impact Academy – 2010–13

Bosnia and Herzegovina
 Željko Đokić – Brantford Galaxy – 2018–20 
 Miloš Đurković  – Serbian White Eagles – 2010–12
 Haris Fazlagić – Brantford Galaxy, SC Waterloo Region, London City SC, Hamilton City SC, Milton SC – 2010, 2012–14, 2014, 2016, 2016–17 
 Faris Efendić – Milton SC, Toronto Croatia, CSC Mississauga – 2015, 2015, 2018
 Jure Glavina  – Toronto Croatia, SC Waterloo Region – 2015, 2017
 Ranko Golijanin – Brantford Galaxy, London City SC, SC Waterloo Region – 2010–11, 2012, 2012, 2013–15 
 Adis Hasečić – SC Waterloo Region, Scarborough SC, SC Waterloo Region – 2012–15, 2016, 2017–19
 Ferid Idrizović  – Brantford Galaxy – 2011 
Zoran Kokot  – Serbian White Eagles, Hamilton City SC – 2007, 2020
 Mladen Kukrika – Scarborough SC – 2015–16
 Armin Mahović – Brantford Galaxy – 2015
 Vladimir Markotić – Brantford Galaxy, London City SC – 2010–11, 2012–15
 Slobodan Milanović  – SC Waterloo Region – 2015 
 Predrag Papaz  – SC Waterloo Region, Burlington SC, Milton SC – 2013, 2014, 2015
 Zoran Rajović  – Serbian White Eagles, Scarborough SC – 2012, 2018–20
Haris Redžepi – Brantford Galaxy, Hamilton City SC – (2015–16, 2018), 2019–20
 Saša Vidović – Brantford Galaxy – 2011, 2015–16
 Vlado Zadro – Toronto Croatia – 2015

Bulgaria
Dimitar Atanasov – Real Mississauga SC – 2018
 Krum Bibishkov – Brantford Galaxy, Scarborough SC, Real Mississauga SC – 2016, 2017, 2018
 Kiril Dimitrov – Serbian White Eagles, SC Waterloo Region, Scarborough SC – 2009–13, 2014, 2015–
 Zdravko Karadachki – Scarborough SC – 2016–17
Dimitar Koemdzhiev – Brantford Galaxy, Real Mississauga SC – 2016–17, 2018
 Dobrin Orlovski – Scarborough SC – 2015–16

Croatia
Aljoša Asanović – Toronto Croatia – 2001
Blazenko Bekavac – Hamilton Thunder – 2004
 Luka Bešenić – Brantford Galaxy – 2015–16 
Domagoj Bešlić – Hamilton Croatia – 2010 
 Josip Bonacin – Toronto Croatia – 2012 
 Velimir Crljen – Toronto Croatia – 2000, 2002–06 
 Petar Dajak – Hamilton Thunder – 2003
 Lazo Džepina  – Hamilton Thunder – 2005
 Dražen Gović  – Brantford Galaxy – 2010
 Goran Grubesic – Toronto Croatia – 2003
 Zdenko Jurčević – Brantford Galaxy, Hamilton City SC – 2015, 2016
 Josip Juric – Toronto Croatia – 2002 
 Saša Milaimović – Hamilton Thunder – 2004
 Jure Pavic – Toronto Croatia – 2003, 2006
 Ante Pavlović – Toronto Croatia – 2004–05 
 Tonći Pirija – Toronto Croatia, London City SC – 2008–12, 2013
 Krešimir Prgomet – Toronto Croatia – 2014
 Ivica Raguž – Toronto Croatia – 2003
 Ivan Razumović – Hamilton Croatia – 2010
 Zoran Roglić – Brantford Galaxy – 2010
 Andelo Srzentic – Toronto Croatia – 2012
 Marijan Vuka – Burlington SC – 2014 
Marko Zelenika – Hamilton City SC – 2018–19
 Ivan Žgela – Toronto Croatia – 2009, 2010 
Ante Živković – Toronto Croatia – 2014
 Antonijo Zupan – Toronto Croatia, Hamilton Croatia, SC Toronto – (2003–06, 2009), 2010, 2011
 Mario Župetić  – Hamilton Thunder, Toronto Croatia – 2003, 2003
 Ante Zurak  – Toronto Croatia – 2010

Czech Republic
 Lukáš Bajer – Kingston FC – 2014 
 Antonín Plachý – Toronto Supra – 2002
 Jaroslav Tesař – Kingston FC – 2013–14

England
 Darren Baxter – Oakville Blue Devils – 2005
 Thomas Beattie – London City SC – 2010–11 
 Stephen Hindmarch – Kingston FC – 2014
 Jason Massie – Kingston FC – 2013 
 Aaron Steele – Hamilton Thunder, Oakville Blue Devils – 2003, 2005
 Darren Tilley – Mississauga Olympians – 2002–03

France
 Cédric Joqueviel – Trois-Rivières Attak – 2007

Germany
 Mélé Temguia – Montreal Impact Academy – 2012

Greece
 Theofanis Sotiris  – York Region Shooters – 2017

Hungary
 Krisztián Kollega – Mississauga Eagles FC – 2012
 Attila Kovacs – Mississauga Eagles P.S.C. – 1998
 Péter Tereánszki-Tóth – Hamilton Croatia – 2010

Israel
 Alon Badat – North York Astros, SC Toronto, Scarborough SC – 2009, 2010–12, 2016 
 Fadi Salback – FC Vorkuta – 2019

Kosovo
 Tony Preci – Toronto Croatia – 2000

Macedonia
 Aleksandar Stojanovski – Serbian White Eagles, York Region Shooters – 2012, 2015–16

Montenegro
 Todor Babović – SC Waterloo Region – 2019
 Luka Bojić – Serbian White Eagles – 2016–2019
 Nikola Đurković – Serbian White Eagles – 2022–
 Dejan Gluščević  – North York Astros – 2001–02
 Božo Milić – Serbian White Eagles – 2006
 Dragan Radović – Serbian White Eagles – 2006–09
 Bojan Šljivančanin – Serbian White Eagles – 2015

Northern Ireland 

 Ryan McCurdy – Kingston FC – 2012–14

 Paul Munster – London City SC – 2004

Poland
 Jurek Gebczynski – London City SC – 1998–00
 Czesław Zajac – Toronto Croatia – 1998–99

Romania
 Daniel Baston – Serbian White Eagles – 2009–10
 Christian Dragoi – Windsor Border Stars, London City SC – 2011–13, 2015
 Mircea Ilcu – Trois-Rivières Attak, Montreal Impact Academy – 2009, 2010
 Cătălin Lichioiu – Kingston FC – 2013–14

Russia
 Boris Krimus – North York Astros – 2003–06
 Platon Krivoshchyokov – North York Astros – 2000
 Andrei Malychenkov – North York Astros – 2000–04
 Vitaliy Sidorov – Kingston FC – 2012

Scotland
 Steven McDougall – York Region Shooters – 2015–16
 Kevin Souter – Serbian White Eagles – 2011
 Ryan Thomson – London City SC – 2000
 Paul Willis – Kingston FC – 2014

Serbia
 Miodrag Anđelković – Brantford Galaxy – 2010
 Nenad Begović – Brantford Galaxy, London City SC – 2010–12, 2012–13 
 Dušan Belić  – Serbian White Eagles – 2006–07
 Zoran Belošević – Milton SC, London City SC – 2015, 2015
 Miroslav Bjeloš – Burlington SC – 2013–14
 Dragan Dragutinović – Serbian White Eagles – 2013–16
 Radovan Ivković – Milton SC – 2015 
 Milan Janošević – Serbian White Eagles – 2006–11
 Vladimir Jašić  – London City SC – 2015 
 Vitomir Jelić – Serbian White Eagles – 2012–20
 Đorđe Jočić  – Serbian White Eagles – 2016–20
 Ivan Jurisic – North York Astros, Brampton Hitmen – 1998–99, 2001–04
 Radenko Kamberović – Serbian White Eagles – 2015–20 
Zoran Knežević – Scarborough SC – 2018– 
 Miloš Kocić – Serbian White Eagles – 2010
 Darko Kolić – Trois-Rivières Attak – 2007
 Marko Krasić – Serbian White Eagles – 2015, 2022–
 Igor Krmar – London City SC, Hamilton City SC – 2015, 2016 
Nikola Lazović  – Scarborough SC – 2021–
 Marko Marović – Serbian White Eagles – 2016–20
 Mirko Medić  – Serbian White Eagles, Brampton City United – (2006–12, 2014–15), 2013 
Dušan Mićić – Serbian White Eagles – 2019–2021
 Boris Miličić – Serbian White Eagles, North York Astros, Scarborough SC, Brantford Galaxy – 2011–13, 2014, 2015, 2015–16
 Dalibor Mitrović – Brantford Galaxy, London City SC – 2011–12, 2012 
 Stefan Mitrović – Hamilton City – 2018–19 
 Nenad Nikolić – London City SC, Burlington SC, Brantford Galaxy – 2012, 2013–15, 2016 
 Siniša Ninković – Serbian White Eagles – 2006
 Rade Novković – Brantford Galaxy, London City SC – 2011–12, 2012–15 
Bojan Pavlović – Serbian White Eagles – 2018
 Ivan Perić – Brampton United – 2015
 Zoran Pešić – Burlington SC, Serbian White Eagles – 2015, 2016–2021
 Dušan Popović – Milton SC – 2015 
 Igor Prostran – Oakville Blue Devils – 2005
 Uroš Predić  – Serbian White Eagles – 2006 
Neven Radaković – Scarborough SC – 2018– 
 Aleksandar Radosavljević – Serbian White Eagles – 2012–13
 Dejan Ristić – Brantford Galaxy – 2015–16 
Momčilo Rudan – Scarborough SC – 2018–20
Stefan Rudan – Scarborough SC – 2018–20
 Uroš Stamatović – Serbian White Eagles – 2007–10
 Ivan Stanković – Serbian White Eagles – 2012–20
 Bojan Stepanović – Burlington SC, Brantford Galaxy – 2014–15, 2016–19
 Nenad Simić – Burlington SC – 2014
 Boban Stojanović – London City SC – 2012–13
 Aleksandar Stojiljković– SC Waterloo Region, Scarborough SC – 2014–15, 2016–
 Goran Švonja – Serbian White Eagles – 2016–20 
 Božidar Tadić – Serbian White Eagles – 2019–21
 Saša Viciknez – Serbian White Eagles – 2006–12
 Nikola Vignjević – Metro Lions – 2003
 Vladimir Vujasinović – Burlington SC, Milton SC – 2013–14, 2016
 Vladimir Vujović – Burlington SC – 2015 
Đorđe Vukobrat  – Hamilton City SC – 2019–
 Branislav Vukomanović – London City SC, Serbian White Eagles – 2013–14, 2014–2021
 Vladimir Zelenbaba  – SC Waterloo Region, Scarborough SC – 2012–15, 2017–19, 2020–
 Mladen Zeljković – SC Waterloo Region – 2015 
Bojan Zoranović  – CSC Mississauga, Scarborough SC, Serbian White Eagles – 2018, 2019, 2020–

Slovakia
 Erik Ľupták – North York Astros – 2014

Slovenia
 Gregor Žugelj – SC Waterloo Region, St. Catharines Hrvat – 2018–19, 2021

Spain 
 Xavi Pérez – York Region Shooters – 2012–14

Ukraine
 Kiril Antonenko – FC Ukraine United, FC Vorkuta B, Toronto Falcons – 2017, 2018, 2022– 
 Andriy Bandrivskyi – FC Ukraine United – 2018–19
 Mykhaylo Basarab – Toronto Atomic FC – 2015–16 
 Said Belmokhtar – FC Vorkuta, Kingsman SC, FC Vorkuta – 2018, 2019, 2021
 Mykhaylo Berezovyi – CSC Mississauga, FC Vorkuta – 2018, 2020
 Volodymyr Bidlovskyi – FC Vorkuta – 2018–20
 Vitaliy Bohdanov  – FC Ukraine United – 2018 
Bohdan Borovskyi – FC Vorkuta – 2019–
 Bogdan Bortnik – FC Vorkuta, Kingsman SC – 2017, 2019
 Roman Botvynnyk –  CSC Mississauga – 2018–19
 Mykhailo Bulkin – FC Ukraine United, FC Vorkuta – 2016, 2017 
Pavlo Chornomaz  – FC Vorkuta – 2019–
 Vasyl Chornyi – FC Ukraine United – 2017–19
 Andriy Dankiv – Toronto Atomic FC – 2015–16 
 Roman Datsiuk – FC Ukraine United – 2018
 Kostyantyn Derevlyov – FC Ukraine United – 2016
 Vitaliy Dnistryan – FC Ukraine United, FC Vorkuta B – 2016, 2017
 Denis Dyachenko – FC Vorkuta, Kingsman SC, Toronto Falcons – 2017–18, 2019, 2022–
 Yevhen Falkovskyi – FC Ukraine United – 2017–18
 Vadym Gostiev – FC Ukraine United, FC Vorkuta, Toronto Falcons – 2016, 2017–21, 2022–
 Valery Haidarzhi – FC Vorkuta – 2017–19
 Lyubomyr Halchuk – FC Ukraine United, FC Vorkuta – 2016, 2017–21
 Maksym Hramm – FC Vorkuta B, Kingsman SC, Toronto Falcons – 2017–2018, 2019, 2022–
 Mykola Hreshta – FC Ukraine United – 2016–18
 Taras Hromyak – FC Ukraine United – 2017–18
 Mykhailo Hurka – FC Ukraine United – 2016–19
 Ihor Ilkiv – Toronto Atomic FC – 2015
 Lubomyr Ivansky – FC Ukraine United – 2016–18
 Sergiy Ivliev – FC Ukraine United, FC Vorkuta – 2016, 2017–
 Stanislav Katana – Toronto Atomic FC, Kingsman SC, Toronto Falcons – 2015–16, 2019, 2022–
 Oleh Kerchu – FC Ukraine United, FC Vorkuta – 2016, 2017–18 
 Vitaliy Kolesnikov –  CSC Mississauga – 2018
 Andriy Kondzyolka – FC Ukraine United – 2017
 Vladimir Koval  – Mississauga Eagles P.S.C., Toronto Croatia, North York Astros, FC Ukraine United – 1998, (1999, 2001), 2000, 2017 
 Hryhoriy Krasovsky – FC Vorkuta, Kingsman SC, FC Vorkuta – 2017, 2019, 2021– 
 Taras Kryvyi – FC Ukraine United – 2019
 Ivan Kucherenko – FC Ukraine United – 2017–19
 Roman Kukharskyi – FC Ukraine United – 2019
 Oleksandr Lakusta – FC Vorkuta, Toronto Falcons – 2017–19, 2022–
 Danylo Lazar – FC Ukraine United, FC Vorkuta – 2016, 2017
 Andriy Lemishevsky – FC Ukraine United, FC Vorkuta B – 2016, 2017
 Pavlo Lukyanets  – FC Ukraine United – 2017–19
 Nazar Lytvyn  – FC Ukraine United – 2016–17 
 Ihor Malysh – FC Ukraine United – 2018
 Ihor Melnyk – Toronto Atomic FC, FC Vorkuta – 2015–16, 2018–
 Ihor Mihalevskyi  – Toronto Atomic FC – 2015–16
 Nazar Milishchuk – FC Ukraine United – 2018–19
 Vitaliy Mishchenko – North York Astros – 2006
 Oleksandr Musiyenko – FC Vorkuta – 2017–19, 2022–
 Oleksandr Muzychuk – FC Ukraine United – 2016
 Dimitri Pachkoria – FC Vorkuta – 2017
 Serhiy Patula – FC Vorkuta – 2017
 Volodymyr Pidvirnyi – FC Vorkuta  – 2017–19 
 Serhiy Pitel – Kingsman SC, FC Continentals – 2019, 2022–
 Roman Pitsur – FC Ukraine United – 2017
 Volodymyr Plishka  – Toronto Atomic FC – 2015–16 
 Bohdan Polyakhov – Toronto Atomic FC – 2016 
Dmytro Polyuhanych – FC Vorkuta, Kingsman SC, FC Vorkuta – 2018, 2019, 2021–
Viktor Raskov – FC Vorkuta, Kingsman SC, FC Vorkuta – 2017–18, 2019, 2020– 
 Bohdan Riabets – FC Vorkuta – 2018–19
 Mykhailo Riabyi – FC Vorkuta – 2017–19
 Volodymyr Romaniv – FC Ukraine United – 2016–19 
 Denys Rylskyi – Toronto Atomic FC – 2015–16 
 Roman Sakhno – Toronto Atomic FC – 2016
 Andriy Savchenko – FC Ukraine United – 2017–19
 Sergey Semenov – FC Ukraine United – 2016–17
 Oleksandr Semenyuk – Toronto Atomic FC – 2015 
 Sergiy Semyon – FC Vorkuta – 2017
 Sergiy Sergeyev  – FC Ukraine United – 2016–18
 Vasyl Shpuk – Toronto Atomic FC, Toronto Falcons – 2015–16, 2022–
 Oleg Shutov – FC Ukraine United, FC Vorkuta – 2016, 2017 
 Bohdan Sluka – FC Vorkuta, Kingsman SC – 2018, 2019
 Oleksandr Sobkovych – FC Ukraine United – 2017 
 Yaroslav Solonynko – FC Vorkuta, Toronto Falcons – 2017–21, 2022–
 Yuri Sokolovsky – FC Ukraine United – 2017–19
 Ivan Sozanskyi – Toronto Atomic FC – 2016 
Anatoly Starushchenko – FC Vorkuta – 2019–
 Yuri Stepaniuk – FC Vorkuta – 2017
 Yaroslav Svorak – FC Vorkuta – 2017
 Oleksandr Tarasenko – FC Ukraine United, FC Vorkuta  – 2017, 2018–19
Mykola Temniuk – FC Vorkuta – 2019– 
Mykyta Tkachov – FC Vorkuta – 2020– 
 Oleksandr Tomakh – Toronto Atomic FC – 2015 
 Serhiy Ursulenko – FC Vorkuta  – 2018 –19, 2021–
 Ihor Vitiv  – Toronto Atomic FC – 2015–16 
 Oleksandr Volchkov – FC Vorkuta – 2017–21
 Denys Yanchuk – FC Vorkuta B – 2017 
 Ruslan Zarubin – FC Vorkuta – 2017 
 Ihor Zhuk – Kingsman SC – 2019 
 Vasyl Zhuk – Toronto Atomic FC, CSC Mississauga – 2016, 2019

North and Central America, Caribbean (CONCACAF)

Antigua and Barbuda
 Peter Byers – Trois-Rivières Attak – 2009

Bahamas
 Happy Hall – North York Astros – 2008 
 Lesly St. Fleur – Milltown FC – 2010

Barbados
 Ryan Lucas – Mississauga Olympians – 2002

Bermuda
 Logan Alexander – Brantford Galaxy – 2012
 Domico Coddington – Durham Storm, Oakville Blue Devils – 2003–04, 2005
 Taurean Manders – Capital City FC, York Region Shooters – 2011, 2012

Cuba
 Reysander Fernández – Brampton City United – 2013–15 
 Yordan Santa Cruz  – Scarborough SC – 2020

Dominica
 Chad Bertrand – London City SC – 2009 
 Euclid Bertrand – London City SC – 2009
 Rasheed Bertrand – London City SC – 2009
 Anthony Dominique – London City SC – 1998
 Kenrick Emanuel – London City SC – 1998–99 
 Paul Victor – London City SC – 2000

Dominican Republic
 Wilson Martínez – York Region Shooters – 2013–14

Grenada
 Rickey Sayers – York Region Shooters B – 2013
 Davier Walcott – North York Astros – 2012

Guyana 

 Shaquille Agard – Serbian White Eagles – 2022

 Taylor Benjamin – Capital City F.C., Kingston FC, London City SC – 2011, 2013, 2014
 Adrian Butters – York Region Shooters – 2016
 Julien Edwards – Capital City F.C., Kingston FC – 2011, 2012
 Konata Mannings – Italia Shooters, North York Astros – 2007, 2008 
Quillan Roberts – TFC Academy, Portugal FC  – (2009, 2011–12), 2010 
 Jamaal Smith – Italia Shooters, SC Toronto – 2008, 2011
 Jelani Smith – Canadian Lions, Italia Shooters – 2007, 2008

Haiti
 Vladimir Edouard – Ottawa Wizards, Laval Dynamites – 2001, (2002–03, 2006)
 Jems Geffrard – Montreal Impact Academy – 2011–12

Jamaica
 Ashton Bennett – York Region Shooters – 2015–2017 
 Michael Binns – York Region Shooters – 2015 
 Shawn Brown – Serbian White Eagles, Mississauga Eagles, SC Waterloo Region, Toronto Croatia, York Region Shooters – 2010, 2011, 2012–2014, 2014–2015, 2016
 Kavin Bryan – York Region Shooters, Scarborough SC – 2017, 2018–
 Fabian Dawkins – Trois-Rivières Attak – 2007 
 Richard Edwards – York Region Shooters – 2013–2017 
 Winston Griffiths – Portuguese Supra, London City SC – 2007, 2010
 Ricky Herron – York Region Shooters – 2011–2016
 Gregory Messam – Metro Lions – 2004 
Marvin Morgan Jr. – Scarborough SC – 2019–
Akeem Priestley – CSC Mississauga – 2018
 Camaal Reid – York Region Shooters, Scarborough SC – 2016–2017, 2021– 
 Richard West – Brampton United, Serbian White Eagles, York Region Shooters – 2011, 2012, 2013–2017

Mexico
 Ruben Flores – Brampton Hitmen – 2003
 Arturo Cisneros Salas – Laval Dynamites – 2002, 2006 
Jesus Eduardo Compean Gonzalez – Scarborough SC, FC Vorkuta – 2019–20, 2021–
 Daniel González Vega – Scarborough SC – 2018
 Ricardo Munguía Pérez – Serbian White Eagles, Scarborough SC – (2007–08, 2011), 2015
 Ángel Velázquez – Brampton Hitmen, Oakville Blue Devils – 2003, 2005

Nicaragua  

 Derick Sequeira  – TFC Academy II – 2012

Saint Kitts and Nevis
 Darryl Gomez – Oshawa Flames, Metro Lions, Toronto Supra, York Region Shooters, Serbian White Eagles – 1999, (2002–04, 2007), 2002, (2005, 2009–10, 2012–13), 2011
 Alain Sargeant – TFC Academy – 2011–12

Saint Lucia 
 Sherwin Emmanuel – Portugal FC, Mississauga Eagles FC – 2010, 2011-12
 Jarvin Skeete – Portugal FC – 2009

Saint Vincent and the Grenadines
 Caswain Mason – Toronto Olympians, Metro Lions, Toronto Croatia, Serbian White Eagles – 2000, (2002–04, 2007), 2005–06, 2008

Trinidad and Tobago
 Shurland David – Ottawa Wizards – 2001–02
 Akil DeFreitas – Capital City FC, Kingston FC – 2011, 2014
 Hayden Fitzwilliams – Mississauga Olympians, Metro Lions, Toronto Croatia, York Region Shooters – 2002, 2003–04, 2005–15, 2016
 Richard Goddard – Ottawa Wizards – 2001
 Roger Groome – Ottawa Wizards – 2002
 Robin Hart – Ottawa Wizards – 2001–03
 Judah Hernandez – Oakville Blue Devils, Brampton Lions, Burlington SC – 2005, 2011, 2013
 Kevin Nelson  – Ottawa Wizards, Hamilton Thunder – 2001–03, 2004
 Marvin Raeburn – Metro Lions – 2003 
Ryan Telfer – Mississauga Eagles FC – 2012
 Densill Theobald – Toronto Olympians – 2000
 Rick Titus  – Toronto Olympians, York Region Shooters – 2000, 2008–10
 Jonathan Westmaas – York Region Shooters, Canadian Lions – (2002–03, 2010), 2007

United States
 Gary Boughton – Niagara United – 2013
 Tony Donatelli – Trois-Rivières Attak – 2008
 Jeremy Harkins  – Windsor Border Stars – 2004–05
 Clint Irwin  – Capital City FC – 2011
 Joe Malachino – Windsor Border Stars – 2005
 Andrew McKay – St. Catharines Wolves – 2000–01
 Paul Moran – Trois-Rivières Attak – 2007
 Tino Scicluna – Windsor Border Stars – 2004–05
 Jaman Tripoli – Windsor Border Stars – 2005
 Andrew Weber – Trois-Rivières Attak – 2007

South America (CONMEBOL)

Argentina
 Juan Cruz Real  – Brampton Hitmen, Hamilton Thunder, North York Astros – 2004, 2005, 2009
 Tati Errecalde – Windsor Border Stars – 2004–05
 Hugo Herrera – Brampton Hitmen, Toronto Croatia – 2003–06, 2007–12 
Christian Lombardo – Toronto Supra – 2001–04 
Raúl Maradona – Toronto Olympians – 1998
 Gabriel Salguero – North York Astros – 2002–05 
 Waldo Sponton – Toronto Supra – 2002

Bolivia
 Roland Vargas-Aguilera – Trois-Rivières Attak – 2008

Brazil
 André Andrade – Brampton Stallions – 2006
 Edmilson de Carvalho Barbosa – Hamilton Thunder – 2004
 Francisco Dos Santos – Brampton Hitmen, Toronto Supra, North York Astros – 2001, 2002, 2005, 2007 2003–04, 2006 
 Osni Neto – Serbian White Eagles – 2007
 Helio Pereira  – Brampton Stallions, Portuguese Supra – 2006, 2007–08
 Fabio Senhorinho Silva  – Toronto Supra – 2003, 2004–06
 Paulo Silva – Brampton Hitmen, North York Astros – 2001, 2003 
 Sullivan Silva – Capital City FC – 2011

Chile
 Cristián Gómez – Brantford Galaxy – 2011

Colombia
 Daniel Arcila – Hamilton City SC – 2018–19
 Janer Guaza Lucumí – SC Toronto – 2012 
 Alexander Posada – Toronto Supra Portuguese – 2006

Uruguay
 Federico Burguez – York Region Shooters B – 2015
 Rafael Carbajal – North York Astros – 1998

Oceania (OFC)

New Zealand
 Daryl Holmes – Toronto Olympians – 1998–02

See also

 List of foreign MLS players
 List of foreign CPL players

References 
 

Expatriate soccer players in Canada
Canadian Soccer League
Lists of expatriate association football players
Association football player non-biographical articles
foreign Canadian Soccer League players